Ballynakill was a constituency represented in the Irish House of Commons until 1800. The town is now spelled Ballinakill.

History
In the Patriot Parliament of 1689 summoned by James II, Ballynakill was not represented.

Members of Parliament, 1613–1801

Notes

References

Bibliography

Historic constituencies in County Laois
Constituencies of the Parliament of Ireland (pre-1801)
1613 establishments in Ireland
1800 disestablishments in Ireland
Constituencies established in 1613
Constituencies disestablished in 1800